Slavery was widespread in the Philippine islands before the archipelago was integrated into the Spanish Empire. Policies banning slavery that the Spanish crown established for its empire in the Americas were extended to its colony in the Philippines. The viceroyalty of New Spain oversaw the Philippine administratively, and the terminus of the Manila galleon in Acapulco sometimes saw the importation of Philippine slaves, who were labeled chinos. Crown policies regarding the favorable treatment of indigenous populations and prohibition of slavery were enforced in the Americas since the early 16th century. These were initially not always adhered to, though with time and following the spread of Christianity slavery was completely abolished.

Slavery in Spanish Colonial Philippines

Enslaving of others by Spanish in Philippines 

Spaniards considered it legitimate to enslave non-Christian captives from wars and trade them legally in the past. This is because they did not consider this as an uncivilized and unchristian act because they believed that men were not created equal and the inferior men may be ruled by the superior ones. Christians, however, were anticipated to show sympathy to the people suffering and this made some masters free their slaves. A lot of them apprenticed their slaves so they could still work under their supervision once they were freed.

There were two major types of slaves: the esclavos negros who were Africans purchased from Portugal, and the esclavos blancos who were Moros taken from wars. They were usually sold in public auctions. People from both the middle and the upper classes bought them, as well as the clergy.

Enslaving of compatriots by native filipinos 

On the other hand, the Filipino society in the olden times were composed of baranganic societies with small populations and low production levels. To harness the rich natural resources of the country, the datus thereafter increased the manpower and made the legal penalties not limited to fines but also included labour services. The debtors also did the same for the creditors since a lot of them did not have many properties to offer as collaterals. This lack in manpower also brought wars that not only did widen a barangay's territories but also increased the number of captives who could work for them. These dependents were called alipin in Tagalog or oripun in Visayan. These slaves were traded legally from one owner to another. The people under a datu also paid tributes except for his personal supporters called timawa who accompanied him in wars.

Comparison of Slavery by Spanish and Slavery by Native Filipinos  

The difference of the slavery practiced by the native Filipinos from the Spanish slavery was that it was arbitrary in a sense that datus may take slaves just from committing minor violations from their laws. Also, Philippine slavery was less harsh in a sense that some of them could eat together with their masters and those who did not live in their masters’ houses supported themselves. On the other hand, Spanish slaves worked solely for their masters and everything that they earned were given to them (the masters). A slave owned by a Spaniard debtor could even be rented out to his creditor and work to pay his debt and the slave could also serve a jail sentence in place of his master. Filipinos made other Filipinos their alipins. On the other hand, Spaniards generally got slaves from other races or religions.

Spanish Slavery in the Philippines  

When Spaniards conquered the archipelago, the Laws of the Indies served as a compilation of royal decrees for the Spanish colonies including the Philippines. This included a law stating that Spaniards were forbidden to hold Filipinos as slaves since they were under the subjection of King Phillip II. Observing the widespread practice of slavery among the native tribes, the Law was sometimes ignored by soldiers, some acting on their own and seizing natives in various parts of the country. Governor-General Legazpi, upon discovering this, freed the slaves and punished those who took them under the jurisdiction of the monarchy.

Later on, the division of Luzon into encomiendas created a form of compulsory work for the encomenderos, who were given the responsibility of evangelizing the natives working for them. Many held workers for household chores. However, it is arguable whether these workers were slaves in the common sense of the word. A Portuguese visitor noted that there was no Spanish soldier who did not have an Indio or native worker. Even the religious houses held at least one. The king, however, after hearing about this, appointed a minister, called the Protector of the Indios, to investigate and restore the liberty of possible slaves. It seemed unfair to encomenderos to generally abolish slavery though and it would cause economic disruption. The General Assembly of 1586 then proposed three points:

 All children are to be born free.
 No new slaves will be made.
 Slaves will have to pay a fair price for freedom.

The king did not implement this, however, and enforced further laws to punish the Spaniards who held Indio slaves. This opened for a new trend which was illegally importing foreigners, especially Africans. Since they were not under the king's subjection, they were not included in the laws and they were made slaves as a replacement for the Indios. Even some Filipinos acquired these foreign slaves and by 1621, blacks constituted around one third of an Intramuros population. These foreign slaves were mainly employed in Manila and not in the provinces.  Some of them were also resold in Mexico during the time of the Manila Galleon Trade to cover transportation costs.

End of Slavery in the Philippines 

Although the king enforced laws to end Spanish slavery in the Philippines, he did not include laws that may end the native Philippine slavery between the Filipinos.  Although it was not completely abolished, it underwent considerable changes during the Spanish occupation. The mangangayaw raids, which were the raiding of barangays for obtaining slaves and territories, disappeared. Tyrannical enslavement also disappeared since the datus were forced to free their slaves and the exchange of slaves in the weddings was not allowed after most Filipinos were converted to Christians. By the middle of the 18th century, Philippine slavery disappeared in areas under the Spanish control. In areas that were not under the Spanish control like mountains in Mindanao and Cordillera, however, it was still present.

Spanish slavery, on the other hand, declined in the Philippines with the decline of slavery in Spain. It was abolished in Spain in 1820, when Spanish liberals took power and reimposed the Spanish Constitution of 1812 on Ferdinand VII,  in Puerto Rico in 1873, and in Cuba in 1886. It was completely abolished after industrialization in all places took place during the nineteenth century.

References

Renato Constantino, The Philippines: A Past Revisited (Quezon City 1975)
William Henry Scott, Slavery in the Spanish Philippines (1991)
"Maharlika and the ancient class system", Pilipino Express Website, Dec 9, 2014, Web

Further reading
 Arcilla, José S. "Slavery, Flogging and Other Moral Cases in 17th century Philippines,," Philippine Studies 20, no. 3 (1972) 399–416.
 Cushner, Nicholas P. Landed Estates in the Colonial Philippines. Vol 20. New Haven: Yale University Press Southeast Asia Studies 1976.
 Garvan, John M. The Negritos of the Philippines. Wiener Beitrage zur Kulturgeschichte und Linguistik. Horn: F. Berger 1964.
 Hidalgo Nuchera, Patricio. "Esclavitud o liberación? El fracaso de las actitudes esclavistas de los conquistadores de Filipinas." Revista Complutense de Historia de América 20 (1994) 61.
 Luengo, Josemaria Salutan. A History of the Manila-Acapulco Slave Trade, 1565-1815. Tubigon, Bohol: Mater Dei Publications 1996.
 Phelan, John Leddy. The Hispanization of the Philippines: Spanish Aims and Filipino Responses, 1565-1700. Madison: University of Wisconsin Press 1959.
 Salman, Michael. "Resisting Slavery in the Philippines: Ambivalent Domestication and the Reversibility of Comparisons," Slavery & Abolition 25 no. 2 (2004) 30.
 Schurz, William. The Manila Galleon. New York: E.P. Dutton 1939, 1959.
 Schwalbenberg, Henry M. "The Economics of Pre-Hispanic Visayan Slave Raiding," Philippine Studies 42, no. 3 (1994) 376-84.
 Scott, William Henry. Slavery in the Spanish Philippines. Manila: De La Salle University Press 1991.
 Seijas, Tatiana. Asian Slaves in Colonial Mexico: From Chinos to Indians. New York: Cambridge University Press 2014.
 Villiers, John. "Manila and Maluku: Trade and Warfare in the Eastern Archipelago, 1580-1640". Philippine Studies'' 34 no. 2 (1986).

History of slavery
History of the Philippines by topic
Economic history of the Philippines